Flying Heels (1927–1940) was an American Thoroughbred racehorse that won stakes races at age two through six, including a number which are Grade I events today. Bred and raced by Gifford A. Cochran, he was sired by the 1925 Kentucky Derby winner, Flying Ebony and out of the racemare Heeltaps.

Flying Heels was trained for Gifford Cochran by future U.S. Racing Hall of Fame inductee, Henry McDaniel. However, Cochran died on December 5, 1930 and at a May 23, 1931 Fasig-Tipton dispersal sale Flying Heels was sold by his Estate to John J. Curtis who turned his training over to the very capable Simon Healy.

At stud
Retired at the end of the 1933 racing season having won seventeen times with earnings of $123,435, Flying Heels was sent to stand at stud at Timberlawn Stock Farm in Bourbon County, Kentucky owned by Edwin K. Thomas. Horses from his first crop foaled in 1935 which began racing in 1937 included nine who were race winners with Spindletop, Shining Heels and Flying Wild winning stakes races.

From his second crop in 1936, his daughter Flying Lill would further enhance Flying Heels' reputation as a sire. Racing at age three in 1939 for owners Mr. and Mrs. Charles H. Cleary, among her wins that year Flying Lill captured the prestigious Kentucky Oaks at Churchill Downs in May and the Matron Stakes in July at Arlington Park. Flying Lill followed that up with another Arlington Park win in the July 19th Springfield Handicap that marked her eighth win out of ten starts for the year. Although Flying Heels was the sire of a number of other winners, none met with his own success or that of Flying Lill.

Flying Heels died on May 8, 1940 in a nighttime barn fire at Timberlawn Stock Farm.

Pedigree

External links
 Flying Heels' pedigree

References

1927 racehorse births
1940 racehorse deaths
Racehorses bred in the United States
Racehorses trained in the United States
Thoroughbred family A4